Hercegovačka radiotelevizija was a Bosnian-Herzegovinian television station in Bosnia and Herzegovina. It was previously owned by the city of Mostar where it is based. However, as of 1 April 2007 it is owned as a joint venture among the mostly Croatian cantons of West Herzegovina, Herzegovina-Neretva and Canton 10.

Mass media in Mostar
Defunct television channels in Bosnia and Herzegovina
Television channels and stations established in 2007